Nasrali is a village in the Khanna tehsil of Ludhiana district in Punjab State, India.

Notable personalities
 Late S. Kapoor Singh Aujla (BA LLB) was born in this village. He was 1st speaker of Punjab assembly. 
Indian movie superstar Dharmendra was born in this village in 1935.
Sr Mohinderjeet Singh Aujla (M.S. Aujla), former director, Town Planning, Local Government, Punjab.
 Dr.Baljinder Nasrali, Punjabi writer and Professor belongs to Nasrali.
 Former Joint Director Of Punjab Vigilance Bureau(1993-1998) Sr Jagir Singh (BA, LLB) captured in the image below (1959) was born in village Nasrali.

References 

  
Villages in Ludhiana district